ANU Productions is a theatre company based in Dublin, Ireland.

The company 
ANU was founded in 2009 by 5 artists from various disciplines Owen Boss (visual artist), Louise Lowe (director), Hannah Mullan (producer) Sophie Motley (director), and Sarah Jane Shiels (lighting designer).

The company state that they are devoted to an interdisciplinary approach to performance / installation that cross-pollinates visual art, dance and theatre in an intensely collaborative way. Examples of this can be seen in Basin, Memory Deleted and World's End Lane.

Owen Boss
Owen holds a Masters of Fine Art from the National College of Art and Design. Exhibitions include Camera Obscura at the Lighthouse Cinema Smithfield (2009), Punctum at Project Arts Centre for Project Brand New (2008), Tumbledowntown for The Artists room at Hotel Ballymun, Pleasures and Wayward Distractions at Broadstone Gallery (2007) and Art and Possibility at Irish Museum of Modern Art (2007).

Louise Lowe
As a theatre maker her work includes: Still Life Still (Prime Cut Productions), Come Forward to Meet You (Upstate), World's End Lane (Nominated Best Production, Irish Times Theatre Awards and Winner Best off-site Production at Absolut Fringe, it was also nominated for Fishamble New Writing Award), Deano (Young Urban Arts / City Arts Centre / Dublin City Council Co-Production), Right Here Right Now (Prime Cut Productions, Grand Opera House Belfast), Working on Fingal Ronain (Robert Wilson Centre New York), Memory Deleted (Winner Best Production Award Belltable Unfringed),  Basin (Dublin Fringe Festival 2009, Winner Best Supporting Actress Award Irish Times Theatre Awards), Corners (Project Arts Centre), Down The Valley (Belltable Unfringed: Winner Spirit of Innovation Award 2009), Rock, Paper, Scissors (Dublin Fringe Festival: Nominated for the Spirit of the Fringe Award / RTÉ Audience Choice Award), 100 Minutes (Project & Samuel Beckett Theatre), Sunny Days (Project Brand New), Scenes from Family Life (National Theatre, London: Connections), The Bus Project (Dublin Fringe Festival), Baby Girl (RDS Dublin & Everyman Palace Theatre Cork), Xspired (Project Arts Centre commission), The Spider Men (Helix / Everyman Palace Theatre) and Tumbledowntown (Winner Spirit of the Fringe Award / Breaking Ground Per Cent for Art Commission).

She was Resident Assistant Director at the Abbey Theatre 2008 -2009. Assistant Directing credits include: The Pride of Parnell Street (Dublin & New York / Fishable) This is Our Youth (Bedrock) Rank (Dublin Theatre Festival & Tricycle London / Fishamble) and The Wonderful World of Dissocia (Calypso).

Productions 
 Corners - Project Arts Centre
 Down the Valley - Innovation Dublin
 BASIN - Dublin Fringe Festival 2009
 Memory Deleted - Unfringed Festival
 World's End Lane - Absolut Fringe 2010
 The Party - Bewley's Cafe Theatre
 The Truth of the Moon - Absolut Fringe 2010
 Laundry - ‘’ Fublin Theatre Festival 2011 ‘’

 The 4 Part Project 
This is a four-part geographical project spanning the history of Foley Street and its environs over the last hundred years. The comprising productions are the already produced WORLD'S END LANE, LAUNDRY, BOYS OF FOLEY STREET and finally, VARDO CORNER'

Together they will reveal the interpenetration of place and culture, creating an evolving work of historical and contemporary detail. Each production spans a specific period od intensive regeneration and renaming from 1925 - 2013.

World's End Lane explores the area as a notorious red light district (Monto) in the days leading to its dramatic closure in April 1925. A major regeneration followed when streets previously littered with brothels were demolished and the land gifted to the church to create a Magdalene home for women known locally as The laundry.

Laundry will be a major site-specific production following the real stories of some of the women who lived there. To combat the squalid conditions and intense poverty in the 1970s, most of the original tenement dwellings were demolished to make way for a new social housing, this was the world of

The Boys of Foley Street when the changing lives of four young men were captured in an RTÉ radio documentary (1975). This production will follow what happened to those boys as they became men.

Finally, on the site of the latest regeneration (Liberty Corner) the company will re-install the infamous caravan (VARDO''') of local Romany fortunetellers Lily (Gypsy Rose) and Terriss Lee. Theirs is the only family who have lived in the area from the 1920s through all its incarnations. At the heart of this project is the extensive family archive of the Lee's, their Romany heritage and the impact they had on generations of their community.

Awards and achievements 
 Nominated two Irish Times Theatre Awards for Best Production 'World's End Lane' and Special Judges Award.
 Winner Best Off Site Production Award, Absolut Fringe 2010
 Nominated Fishamble New Writing Award 2010
 Nominated best actress award, Absolut Fringe 2010
 Winner: Best Production Award, Belltable Unfringed
 Winner: Best Supporting Actress Award, Irish Times Theatre Awards 2009
 Winner: Best Actress Award, Absolut Fringe 2009

External links 
 Podcast of lecture at UCD Humanities Institute - Laundry and the memory of the Magdalen Laundries

Theatre companies in the Republic of Ireland
Organizations established in 2009
Alumni of the National College of Art and Design